John James "Speedo" Loughran (October 30, 1898 - ~1988) was an American football player and coach. He served as the head football coach at Saint Francis University in Loretto, Pennsylvania from 1923 to 1924.

Loughran played college football at the University of Pittsburgh, where he was part of the 1918 Pittsburgh Panthers national championship team.

Speedo was one of Pitt's only athlete to letter in four varsity sports - football, basketball, baseball and track. He was coached by "Doc" Flint.

See also
 List of college football coaches with 0 wins

References

1898 births
Year of death missing
American football halfbacks
Centers (basketball)
Pittsburgh Panthers football players
Pittsburgh Panthers men's basketball players
Saint Francis Red Flash football coaches